is a Japanese digital advertising company, which was founded in 1998 by Susumu Fujita and headquartered in Shibuya, Tokyo. It is owned by Susumu Fujita with 20.50% interest; Fujita is representative director, while Yusuke Hidaka is executive vice president.

CyberAgent is listed on the Tokyo Stock Exchange and is a constituent of the Nikkei 225 since 2000.

In 2016, it established a live streaming service called . On April 1, 2016 it was transferred to CyberAgent subsidiary AbemaTV and its name was changed to AbemaTV Fresh!, and on June 26, 2018 its name was changed to Fresh Live. Termination of the service began on February 12, 2019, when the creation of new channels, in addition to archiving and other functions, were disabled for most channels. Complete closure of the service on November 30, 2020, was announced on October 9, 2020. Since 2019, CyberAgent integrated the service with Openrec.tv, another live streaming service operated by CyberAgent subsidiary CyberZ, and some channels migrated to that service.

Controversies and criticism
In April 2015 a former employee of CyberAgent accused the company of unauthorized stealing of articles and images, inappropriate quoting, and undercover marketing were often pointed out with BuzzFeed Japan also accusing the company for the same thing but allegations were later denied.

In the fall of 2016, DeNA's healthcare information website "WELQ" had a problem due to inappropriate content and inappropriate citations, and from December 1 to 2, 2016, thousands of articles related to medical and health related to “Spotlight” and a few percent of approximately 35,000 articles related to by.S were deleted. CyberAgent explained that the privately held articles were written by registered users and with company claiming could not be fully verified with addiction expanded the scope of private disclosure, and deleted all articles posted by registered users on both websites. A total of less than 100,000 articles were deleted.

References

External links

Official site 
Official English site

 
Companies listed on the Tokyo Stock Exchange
Digital marketing companies
Entertainment companies of Japan
Entertainment companies established in 1998
FC Machida Zelvia
Tokyo Verdy
Holding companies based in Tokyo
Holding companies established in 1998
Internet properties established in 1998
Japanese brands
Japanese companies established in 1998
Mass media companies based in Tokyo
Mass media companies of Japan
Mass media companies established in 1998
Mobile game companies
Multinational companies headquartered in Japan
Pro Wrestling Noah
DDT Pro-Wrestling
Software companies based in Tokyo
Video game companies established in 1998
Video game companies of Japan
Video game development companies
Video game publishers
2000 initial public offerings